Tatuanui is a settlement and rural community in the Matamata-Piako District and Waikato region of New Zealand's North Island.

It is located north-east of Morrinsville, south-west of Te Aroha, Waihou and Waitoa, and north of Ngarua, at the intersection of State Highway 26 and State Highway 27. The intersection was converted to a roundabout between June and December 2011 for safety reasons.

Demographics
The SA1 area is part of the larger Tatuanui statistical area.

The SA1 area had a population of 264 at the 2018 New Zealand census, a decrease of 6 people (−2.2%) since the 2013 census, and a decrease of 48 people (−15.4%) since the 2006 census. There were 90 households, comprising 132 males and 129 females, giving a sex ratio of 1.02 males per female. The median age was 29.9 years (compared with 37.4 years nationally), with 75 people (28.4%) aged under 15 years, 57 (21.6%) aged 15 to 29, 114 (43.2%) aged 30 to 64, and 18 (6.8%) aged 65 or older.

Ethnicities were 93.2% European/Pākehā, 9.1% Māori, 2.3% Pacific peoples, 2.3% Asian, and 3.4% other ethnicities. People may identify with more than one ethnicity.

Although some people chose not to answer the census's question about religious affiliation, 69.3% had no religion, 23.9% were Christian, 1.1% were Hindu and 1.1% had other religions.

Of those at least 15 years old, 33 (17.5%) people had a bachelor's or higher degree, and 42 (22.2%) people had no formal qualifications. The median income was $44,100, compared with $31,800 nationally. 48 people (25.4%) earned over $70,000 compared to 17.2% nationally. The employment status of those at least 15 was that 129 (68.3%) people were employed full-time, 30 (15.9%) were part-time, and 0 (0.0%) were unemployed.

Tatuanui statistical area

The statistical area had a population of 1,377 at the 2018 New Zealand census, an increase of 39 people (2.9%) since the 2013 census, and a decrease of 102 people (−6.9%) since the 2006 census. There were 477 households, comprising 708 males and 669 females, giving a sex ratio of 1.06 males per female. The median age was 35.0 years (compared with 37.4 years nationally), with 336 people (24.4%) aged under 15 years, 276 (20.0%) aged 15 to 29, 609 (44.2%) aged 30 to 64, and 156 (11.3%) aged 65 or older.

Ethnicities were 88.0% European/Pākehā, 14.6% Māori, 1.7% Pacific peoples, 3.9% Asian, and 1.7% other ethnicities. People may identify with more than one ethnicity.

The percentage of people born overseas was 10.7, compared with 27.1% nationally.

Although some people chose not to answer the census's question about religious affiliation, 55.6% had no religion, 34.2% were Christian, 0.4% had Māori religious beliefs, 0.7% were Hindu, 1.1% were Muslim, 0.2% were Buddhist and 1.5% had other religions.

Of those at least 15 years old, 129 (12.4%) people had a bachelor's or higher degree, and 237 (22.8%) people had no formal qualifications. The median income was $44,600, compared with $31,800 nationally. 237 people (22.8%) earned over $70,000 compared to 17.2% nationally. The employment status of those at least 15 was that 630 (60.5%) people were employed full-time, 189 (18.2%) were part-time, and 15 (1.4%) were unemployed.

Dairy industry

Dairy factory
The Tatua Dairy Company factory is a central feature of the township. Tatua is an independent co-operative dairy company owned by 114 shareholder farms, all located within a 12 kilometre radius of the processing site. It employs 370 staff and exports specialist dairy products to more than 60 countries.

The co-operative has maintained a strong independent history within the New Zealand dairy industry. In the 2001 mega-merger for the New Zealand dairy industry which formed Fonterra, Tatua shareholders decided to remain independent. New Zealand had over 500 dairy co-operatives in the 1930s, but Tatua is the only New Zealand dairy co-operative remaining that has never been part of any merger throughout its history.

Tatua often records the highest payout for milk solids to the farmer shareholders in New Zealand. While the high level of payout is partly due to a small catchment area (which reduces processing costs), the high financial performance of Tatua has been attributed to its focus on value-added milk products rather than traditional, mass-produced, commodity-based milk products such as milk powder, butter and cheese.

Dairy Whip can

A giant model of a can of whipped cream sits outside the factory as an landmark for the township. The 12-metre high stainless steel silo was rebranded as Tatua Dairy Whip in 2013. It was severely crumpled in 2016, but the cause of the damage remained a mystery.

The model was replaced again later that year, and underwent a further makeover in 2019.

Farming

The area's sandy and silty soil makes it vulnerable to pugging and soil compaction.

The Ministry for Primary Industries held a public meeting in the township in October 2019 following several new Waikato cases of the cattle disease Mycoplasma bovis.

Sports and facilities

The local tennis club began in 1921 and was formally incorporated in 1934. The club caters for players as young as 6.

The township has a hall available for community events.

Education

It was established in 1918 and celebrated its centenary in October 2018.

The school buildings, drains and playground were built by volunteers from the local community, and caretaking activities have traditionally been done at parent working bees and by students during class time.

References

Matamata-Piako District
Populated places in Waikato